The Ulaan-Uul mine (red mountain) is an underground mine located in the Nogoonnuur sum of Khovd aimag in western Mongolia.

Ulaan-Uuul exploits the Kyzyl Tau ore field. The main ore minerals in the veins are wolframite, fluorite, beryl and minor molybdenite. The reserves are estimated at 3.100 tons of wolfram at an ore concentration of 1.3 - 3.4%.

References 

Tungsten mines in Mongolia
Underground mines in Mongolia